Robert Alan Johnston   (born 19 July 1924) is an Australian economist who served as the 4th Governor of the Reserve Bank of Australia.

Born in Moonee Ponds in Melbourne, Victoria, he served in Southeast Asia during World War II as part of the Air Force. Johnston was behind the introduction of the Polymer banknote technology, one of Australia’s greatest inventions and exports and is a point of national pride.

References

1924 births
Living people
Australian economists
Governors of the Reserve Bank of Australia